Humus Sapien (Sonny Baredo) is a fictional supervillain appearing in American comic books published by Marvel Comics. He first appeared as Humus Sapiens in FOOM #3 (Autumn 1973), created by Michael A. Barreiro. He first appeared as Humus Sapien in Thunderbolts #54 (Sept. 2001), by the writer-artist team of Fabian Nicieza and Patrick Zircher.

Publication history

FOOM
Humus Sapien first appeared in Marvel's self-produced fan magazine, FOOM # 3 (Fall 1973), created (as supervillain Humus Sapiens) by Michael A. Barreiro of Penn Hills, Pennsylvania, and was the winning entry in the magazine's character-creation contest. Although FOOM founding editor Jim Steranko wrote in the premiere-issue introduction that "(t)he winning entry (to be selected by Ol' Smilin' Stan [Lee] himself) will become a super guest-star featured in one of Marvel's top hero mags!", this never occurred, and both the character and the contest faded into obscurity.

Later, Barreiro inquired about the character but received no response from Marvel. In 1979, Buyer's Guide to Comic Fandom columnist, Fred Hembeck, wrote about the character and contest and, though nothing immediately came of it, the column prompted Tom Brevoort, editor of Marvel's Thunderbolts, to call Barreiro two decades later with an offer to use the character.

Thunderbolts
In 1998, writer Kurt Busiek and editor Tom Brevoort decided to use Barreiro's character in the superhero series, Thunderbolts. Fabian Nicieza, who succeeded Busiek as Thunderbolts writer (and had also entered the FOOM contest), agreed. Renamed Humus Sapien, the character finally debuted, after 28 years, in Thunderbolts #54 (cover-dated Sept. 2001). Barreiro was allowed to ink one page of the issue featuring the character.

Fictional character biography
Humus Sapien fought the Redeemers  when he emerged from a suspended animation chamber where he had been imprisoned by Ogre and Factor Three. He has vaguely defined superhuman abilities powered by Earth's population; however, each time he uses his powers, random people around the world die. Humus Sapien's final battle, after which he voluntarily leaves Earth, drains the lives of 2,400 random people across the globe, including the Middle Eastern superhero, the Arabian Knight.

References

External links
 

Marvel Comics mutants
Marvel Comics supervillains
Visual arts competitions
1973 competitions